Adi Maia Bichman (born February 5, 1983) is an Israeli former Olympic swimmer.

She participated in the 2000 Summer Olympics in Sydney, where she swam in the 400m and 800m freestyle, as well as the 400m medley. She attended Rice University on an athletic scholarship.

See also
List of select Jewish swimmers
List of Israeli records in swimming

References

External links
 

1983 births
Living people
Rice Owls women's swimmers
Israeli Jews
Israeli female swimmers
Jewish swimmers
Olympic swimmers of Israel
Swimmers at the 2000 Summer Olympics
Academic staff of Ono Academic College
Israeli female freestyle swimmers
American women academics
21st-century American women